Qush Qayahsi (also Romanized as Qūsh Qayahsī; also known as Qūshqāyā) is a village in Zolbin Rural District, Yamchi District, Marand County, East Azerbaijan Province, Iran. At the 2006 census, its population was 147, in 31 families.

References 

Populated places in Marand County